Matthew Hale may refer to:

 Mathew Hale (bishop) (1811–1895), frequently spelled "Matthew", Anglican bishop in Australia; Bishop of Perth; Bishop of Brisbane
 Matthew Hale (jurist)  (1609–1676), English jurist
 Matthew Hale (New York politician) (1829–1897), New York lawyer and politician
 Matthew F. Hale (born 1971), American white supremacist, neo-Nazi leader and convicted felon

See also
 Matthew Hales, real name of singer-songwriter Aqualung